Byki may refer to:

 Byki (village), a village in central Poland
 Byki (software) ("Before You Know It"), language acquisition software